Jan Espen Kruse (born 9 July 1956) is a Norwegian journalist and correspondent.

He was born in Larvik. In 1990 he joined the Norwegian Broadcasting Corporation's foreign news desk, and from 1991 to 1996 he was their correspondent in Moscow. From 2003 to 2007 he held the same position in Washington, DC, and in 2018 he was hired for a new stint in Moscow.

References

1956 births
Living people
People from Larvik
NRK people
Norwegian television reporters and correspondents
Norwegian expatriates in Russia
Norwegian expatriates in the United States